The 2016–17 Women's EHF Cup was the 36th edition of EHF's second-tier women's handball competition. It started on 9 September 2016.

Overview

Team allocation

The labels in the parentheses show how each team qualified for the place of its starting round:
TH: Title holders
CWC: EHF Women's Cup Winners' Cup holders
1st, 2nd, 3rd, 4th, 5th, 6th, etc.: League position
CW: Domestic cup winners
CR: Domestic cup runners-up
CL QT: Losers from the Champions League qualification stage.
CL Group: Losers from the Champions League group stage.

Round and draw dates
All draws held at the European Handball Federation headquarters in Vienna, Austria.

Qualification stage

Round 1
There is 42 teams participating in round 2.

|}

Round 2
There is 32 teams participating in round 2.

21 teams who qualified from round 1 and 11 teams joining the draw.

|}

Round 3
There is 24 teams participating in round 3.

16 teams who qualified from round 2 and 8 teams joining the draw.

|}

Group stage
There is 16 teams participating in the group phase.

12 teams who qualified from round 3 and 4 teams joining the draw.

Seedings 
The seedings were announced on 21 November 2016

Teams in the draw will be protected against meeting teams from the same country in the same group.

The first round of the group phase was scheduled for 7–8 January and the last round took place on 11–12 February.

Only the top two teams of each group made it to the quarter-finals.

Group A

Group B

Group C

Group D

Knockout stage

Quarter-finals
Teams listed first played the first leg at home. Bolded teams qualified into semi-finals.

|}

Semi-finals 

|}

Final 

|}

See also
2016–17 Women's EHF Champions League 
2016–17 Women's EHF Challenge Cup

References

External links
 Official website

Women's EHF Cup
EHF Cup Women
EHF Cup Women